Antti Eerkki Tyrväinen (5 November 1933 – 13 October 2013) was a Finnish biathlete and Olympic medalist. He received a silver medal at the 1960 Winter Olympics in Squaw Valley, and silver medals in the World Championships in 1962 and 1963 together with a bronze medal in 1965. He was born in Ylöjärvi.

Biathlon results
All results are sourced from the International Biathlon Union.

Olympic Games
1 medal (1 silver)

World Championships
6 medals (1 gold, 4 silver, 1 bronze)

*During Olympic seasons competitions are only held for those events not included in the Olympic program.
**The team (time) event was removed in 1965, whilst the relay was added in 1966.

References

External links
 

1933 births
2013 deaths
People from Ylöjärvi
Finnish male biathletes
Biathletes at the 1960 Winter Olympics
Biathletes at the 1964 Winter Olympics
Olympic biathletes of Finland
Medalists at the 1960 Winter Olympics
Olympic medalists in biathlon
Olympic silver medalists for Finland
Biathlon World Championships medalists
Sportspeople from Pirkanmaa